Donald Gene Truhlar (born 27 February 1944, Chicago) is an American scientist working in theoretical and computational chemistry and chemical physics with special emphases on quantum mechanics and chemical dynamics.

Education and early work
Truhlar received a B.A., from St. Mary's College of Minnesota (1965), and a Ph. D., from Caltech (1970), under  Aron Kuppermann. 
He has been on the faculty of the University of Minnesota from 1969–present.

Important contributions
Truhlar is known for his contributions to theoretical chemical dynamics of chemical reactions; quantum mechanical scattering theory of chemical reactions and molecular energy transfer; electron scattering; theoretical kinetics and chemical dynamics; potential energy surfaces and molecular interactions; path integrals; variational transition state theory; the use of electronic structure theory for calculations of chemical structure, reaction rates, electronically nonadiabatic processes, and solvation effects; photochemistry; combustion chemistry; heterogeneous, homogeneous, and enzyme catalysis; atmospheric and environmental chemistry; drug design; nanoparticle structure and energetics; and density functional theory, including the Minnesota Functionals. To date, he has authored or co-authored more than 1300 scientific papers in peer-reviewed journals. As of 2023, with an h-index of 191, one of his papers (in which the M06 density functional methods were described) had received more than 24,000 citations and his total body of work had been cited over 210,500 times.

Awards and honors
Truhlar was elected to the International Academy of Quantum Molecular Science (2006), the National Academy of Sciences of the USA (2009), and the American Academy of Arts and Sciences (2015). He became an Honorary Fellow of the Chinese Chemical Society in 2015. He was named a Fellow of the American Association for the Advancement of Science, (1986) the American Chemical Society (2009), the American Physical Society (1986), the Royal Society of Chemistry (2009), and the World Association of Theoretical and Computational Chemists (2006). He was a visiting Fellow at the Battelle Memorial Institute (1973) and at the Joint Institute for Laboratory Astrophysics (1975–76), and was named an Alfred P. Sloan Foundation Research Fellow (1973).

He received the NSF Creativity Award (1993), the ACS Award for Computers in Chemical and Pharmaceutical Research (2000), the Minnesota Award (2003) ("for outstanding contributions to the chemical sciences"), the National Academy of Sciences Award for Scientific Reviewing (2004); the ACS Peter Debye Award for Physical Chemistry (2006), the Lise Meitner Lectureship Award (2006), the Schrödinger Medal of The World Association of Theoretical and Computational Chemists (2006), the Dudley R. Herschbach Award for Research in Molecular Collision Dynamics (2009), Doctor honoris causa of Technical University of Lodz, Poland, (2010), the Royal Society of Chemistry Chemical Dynamics Award (2012), the APS Earle K. Plyler Prize for Molecular Spectroscopy and Dynamics (2015), and the 2019 ACS Award in Theoretical Chemistry (2018).

Truhlar has served as an Associate Editor of the Journal of the American Chemical Society (1984–2016), as (successively) editor, editor-in-chief, associate editor, and chief advisory editor of Theoretical Chemistry Accounts (formerly Theoretica Chimica Acta) (1985–present), and as a principal editor of  Computer Physics Communications (1986–2015). He is currently a Regents Professor at the University of Minnesota.

References

External links
The Truhlar Group 
Google Scholar Citations

1944 births
Living people
University of Minnesota faculty
Theoretical chemists
21st-century American chemists
Members of the United States National Academy of Sciences
Schrödinger Medal recipients
Computational chemists
Fellows of the American Association for the Advancement of Science
Fellows of the American Chemical Society
Fellows of the American Physical Society
Fellows of the Royal Society of Chemistry
Sloan Research Fellows